John Victor Maciel Furtado (born 13 February 1996), known as John, is a Brazilian footballer who plays as a goalkeeper for Internacional, on loan from Santos.

Club career

Santos

Beginnings
Born in Diadema, São Paulo, John joined Santos' youth setup in February 2011 at the age of 15, after starting out at São Paulo FC. In 2015, with the departure of Aranha, he was called up to train with the first team in some occasions.

On 20 January 2016, John renewed his contract with Peixe until 2021, being definitely promoted to the main squad as a third choice behind Vanderlei and Vladimir. He made his unofficial first team debut on 8 October, playing 25 minutes in a 1–1 friendly draw against Benfica.

Loan to Portuguesa Santista
On 11 December 2018, John was loaned to Portuguesa Santista for the 2019 season. He was an undisputed starter during the 2019 Campeonato Paulista Série A2 before returning to his parent club.

Breakthrough
On 13 December 2019, John further extended his contract with Santos until December 2023. Initially a fourth-choice behind Everson, Vladimir and João Paulo at the start of the 2020 campaign, he became a second-choice after Everson left and Vladimir was sidelined due to an injury.

John made his official – and Série A – debut for Santos on 14 November 2020, starting and keeping a clean sheet in a 2–0 home win against Internacional. He made his Copa Libertadores debut ten days later, playing the full 90 minutes and making several key stops in a 2–1 away success over LDU Quito.

On 8 January 2021, John and teammate Wagner Leonardo tested positive for COVID-19. Upon returning, he shared the starting spot with João Paulo before suffering a knee injury in August.

After being fully recovered, John spent the 2022 campaign as a backup to undisputed starter João Paulo, playing in just two matches during the year.

Loan to Internacional
On 18 January 2023, Santos announced the loan of John to fellow top tier club Internacional until the end of the year; he also renewed his contract with his parent club until the end of 2025.

Career statistics

Honours
Santos
Campeonato Paulista: 2016

References

External links
Santos FC profile 

1996 births
Living people
Footballers from São Paulo (state)
Brazilian footballers
Association football goalkeepers
Campeonato Brasileiro Série A players
Santos FC players
Associação Atlética Portuguesa (Santos) players
Sport Club Internacional players
Brazil youth international footballers
People from Diadema